is a Japanese football player. He plays for FC Tokyo.

Career
Yoshiatsu Oiji joined FC Tokyo in 2016. On March 13, he debuted in J3 League (v SC Sagamihara).

References

External links

1998 births
Living people
Association football people from Tokyo
Japanese footballers
J1 League players
J3 League players
FC Tokyo players
FC Tokyo U-23 players
Association football midfielders